Scabrotrophon inspiratus is a species of sea snail, a marine gastropod mollusk, in the family Muricidae, the murex snails or rock snails.

Description
The length of the shell attains 39 mm.

Distribution
This marine species occurs off Papua New Guinea and Vanuatu.

References

 Houart, R. & Héros, V. (2016). New species and records of deep water muricids (Gastropoda: Muricidae) from Papua New Guinea. Vita Malacologica. 15: 7-34.

External links
 Houart, R. (2003). Description of Scabrotrophon inspiratum new species (Gastropoda: Muricidae) from Vanuatu. The Nautilus. 117 (3): 87-90
 Houart R. & Héros V. (2012) New species of Muricidae (Gastropoda) and additional or noteworthy records from the western Pacific. Zoosystema 34(1): 21–37

inspiratus
Gastropods described in 2003